Thyrocopa spilobathra is a moth of the family Xyloryctidae. It was first described by Edward Meyrick in 1915. It is endemic to the Hawaiian island of Oahu. It may be extinct.

The length of the forewings is 8–9 mm. Adults are on wing at least in July. The ground color of the forewings is light brown with a few brown scales scattered throughout. The discal area is clouded with poorly defined brownish spots in the cell and evenly spaced spots on the distal half of the costa and along the termen at the vein endings, they are sometimes faint. The hindwings are light brown except for the anal margin, which is sometimes darker brown. The fringe is light brown.

External links

Thyrocopa
Endemic moths of Hawaii
Moths described in 1915